The 1983–84 season saw Rochdale compete in their 10th consecutive season in the Football League Fourth Division.

Statistics
																												
																												

|}

Final League Table

Competitions

Football League Fourth Division

F.A. Cup

League Cup (Milk Cup)

Associate Members' Cup

Lancashire Cup

References

Rochdale A.F.C. seasons
Rochdale